Georges Colombier (born 8 March 1940 in Bourgoin-Jallieu, Isère) was a member of the National Assembly of France from 1986 to 2012.  He represented the 7th constituency of the Isère department, as a member of a number of groups, most recently the Union for a Popular Movement.

References

1940 births
Living people
People from Bourgoin-Jallieu
Liberal Democracy (France) politicians
Union for a Popular Movement politicians
Deputies of the 8th National Assembly of the French Fifth Republic
Deputies of the 9th National Assembly of the French Fifth Republic
Deputies of the 10th National Assembly of the French Fifth Republic
Deputies of the 11th National Assembly of the French Fifth Republic
Deputies of the 12th National Assembly of the French Fifth Republic
Deputies of the 13th National Assembly of the French Fifth Republic